The Pompogne Solar Park is a 40 MW solar farm in France. It has about 175,000 photovoltaics panels made by REC Solar.

See also 

Photovoltaic power station
List of photovoltaic power stations

References 

Photovoltaic power stations in France